Zadlog ( or) is a settlement northwest of Črni Vrh in the Municipality of Idrija in the traditional Inner Carniola region of Slovenia.

Notable people
Notable people that were born or lived in Zadlog include:
 Frančišek Lampe (1859–1900), philosopher, theologian, writer, and editor
 Marko Ivan Rupnik (born 1954), mosaicist and theologian

References

External links
Zadlog on Geopedia

Populated places in the Municipality of Idrija